Antonio Don Archuleta (1855 – ) was a member of the Colorado Senate and the namesake of Archuleta County; he was influential in its formation.

Biography
Archuleta was born in 1855 in Taos, New Mexico Territory, to José Manuel Archuleta; he moved to Colorado Territory shortly after his birth. He was descended from "one of the old Spanish families of New Mexico". In 1876, he was elected as a Republican to the Colorado House of Representatives from Conejos County and to the Colorado Senate in 1883, serving until 1887. Archuleta introduced legislation in 1885 for the formation of Archuleta County; he moved there in 1887 following the completion of his term and became a rancher. Archuleta County was named in honor his father, Hon. José Manuel de Jesus Archuleta and family.

Archuleta was described as a "friend and supporter of the McKinley administration." He was a member of the Woodmen of the World fraternal organization.

Archuleta married Lauriana (or Lauranna) Gallegos in 1877; she died in 1920. They had one son, Daniel Ross Archuleta. Archuleta was killed in 1918 near Pilares de Nacozari, Nacozari de García Municipality, Sonora, Mexico.

References

1855 births
1918 deaths
American people of Spanish descent
Republican Party Colorado state senators
Republican Party members of the Colorado House of Representatives
Neomexicanos
People from Conejos County, Colorado
People from Pagosa Springs, Colorado
People from Taos, New Mexico
People murdered in Mexico
Ranchers from Colorado
19th-century American politicians
People from Archuleta County, Colorado